The Morris-Taney-class revenue cutters were 13 cutters built at New York City at the Webb and Allen shipyard between 18301833. These cutters were the backbone of the United States Revenue-Marine for more than a decade. Samuel Humphreys designed these cutters for roles as diverse as fighting pirates, privateers, combating smugglers and operating with naval forces.  He designed the vessels on a naval schooner concept.  They had Baltimore Clipper lines. The vessels, built by Webb and Allen, were designed by Isaac Webb and resembled Humphreys' design but had one less port.

According to William Thiessen, this was the first class of cutters where all ships were identical.

Ships

References